The 2008–09 Everton F.C. season was Everton's 17th season in the Premier League, and their 55th consecutive season in the top division of English football. The club's kit was provided by Umbro, and the sponsor was Chang beer.

Kits

Review and events

Monthly events
This is a list of the significant events to occur at the club during the 2008–09 season, presented in chronological order. This list does not include transfers, which are listed in the transfers section below, or match results, which are in the results section. However it does summarise the transfers made by Everton in the summer. It also includes Cup Draws.

July:

 4 - Steve Round is announced as Everton's new assistant manager.
 10 - The Guardian report on two further mortgages taken out by Everton against future bSkyb television revenue.
 18 - Everton shareholders deliver a petition to the club demanding an Extraordinary General Meeting having achieved over 20% of the support necessary to call such a meeting.
 25 - Club captain Phil Neville signs a new four-year contract to keep him at the club until 2012.
 27 - Sporting CP reject Everton's £11.8 million bid for midfielder João Moutinho.
 29 - Everton CEO Keith Wyness resigns. No official reason is stated at the time, except that it is not in connection with Everton's planned new stadium in Kirkby.

August:
 16 - Jose Baxter becomes Everton's youngest player to make a competitive appearance when he comes on against Blackburn Rovers in the Premier League. Baxter was aged 16 years and 191 days.
 23 - Jose Baxter becomes Everton's youngest player to be selected for a competitive match, when he starts against West Bromwich Albion in the Premier League. Baxter was aged 16 years and 198 days.
28 - Everton are drawn with Standard Liège in the first round of the UEFA Cup, with the first game being at Goodison Park.
29 - Everton are drawn away to Blackburn in the third round of the League Cup
 31 - Everton break its transfer record after acquiring Marouane Fellaini for £15 million, £3.75 million more than Yakubu was purchased for from Middlesbrough FC in 2007. This was the club's fifth signing of August, following Lars Jacobsen, Louis Saha, Segundo Castillo and Carlo Nash.

Final league table

Squad details

Players information

Player awards 
 Player of the Season - Phil Jagielka
 Players' Player of the Season - Phil Jagielka
 Young Player of the Season - Marouane Fellaini
 Reserve / U21 Player of the Season - Kieran Agard
 Academy Player of the Season - James McCarten
 Goal of the Season - Dan Gosling vs. Liverpool

Matches

Pre-season friendlies

Premier League

UEFA Cup

League Cup

FA Cup

Season statistics

Starts and goals

|}

Goalscorers

Yellow cards

Transfers

Transfers in

Transfers out

Loans in

Loans out

References

External links
 Official Site: 2007/2008 Fixtures & Results 
 BBC Sport - Club Stats
 Soccerbase - Results | Squad Stats | Transfers

2008–09 Premier League by team
2008-09